Thomas Wyttenbach (1472; after 21 September 1526) was one of the reformers of the city of Biel, Switzerland, during the Protestant Reformation.

Wyttenbach was born in Biel. He studied liberal arts and theology at the University of Tübingen from 1496 to 1504; he was awarded Baccaleureus in 1498, 1500 Master of Arts in 1550, and Bachelor biblicus in 1504. In 1505, he moved to the University of Basel, where he worked as Sententiarius. Among his students were Ulrich Zwingli and Leo Jud. In 1507, he became a priest appointed by the town church in Biel. He continued his studies and received a doctorate in theology in 1515.

In the years 1515 to 1520, he was chorus master (custodian) of the St. Vinzentenstifts in Bern, Biel. From 1520, he worked until his death in Biel. In a reply to Zwingli Wyttenbach on 15 June 1523, he stated that he rejected the doctrine of transubstantiation. Wyttenbach married in the summer of 1524 (name of wife unknown), which is why he was dismissed from his sinecure at the town church. He preached in the church but on the Biel John.

Honours 
In Biel, the Thomas Wyttenbach-street is named after him.

References 

1472 births
1526 deaths
People from Biel/Bienne
Swiss Protestant Reformers
15th-century Swiss people
16th-century Swiss people
Thomas